The Windsor Arms Apartments is an historic five-storey, 42-unit apartment building located at 150 Argyle Avenue in Ottawa, Ontario.

History

The Windsor Arms Apartments was designed by architect Cecil Burgess  and was completed on 1 April 1930 at the cost of $300,000 (1930 dollars), which the builder claimed to be 85% above the average cost of construction because of conveniences put into the structure.  The building's design features a detailed entrance portico, stained and leaded glass windows, and wood-burning fireplaces in some units.  When first tenanted, the building offered lobby and parking attendants and maid services.

In June 1984, the then landlord informed tenants that the building would be sold for conversion into a form of condominium, in which purchasers would have bought units as tenants-in-common (with each owner having a stake in the property, without owning a specific part of the building), thereby sidestepping a municipal by-law preventing apartment-condominium conversations in place at the time.  In November of the same year, it was reported that the tenants successfully fought off the conversion scheme, and the owner of the day confirmed that the condo development deal was "up the flue" and that it would be more profitable to convert the ground floor units into offices.    The current property management, Andrex Holdings, has returned all units to residential occupancy.

Designation & Restoration
The building is a designated Category 1 heritage building within the Centretown Heritage Conservation District.  In 2009, the City of Ottawa awarded a 'Certificate of Merit – Restoration' to Keystone Traditional Masonry Inc. and Andrex Holdings Ltd. for the rebuilding of the staggered brick and stone parapets.

References

Apartment buildings in Canada
Residential buildings in Ottawa